Hangama is a singer from Afghanistan.  Originally born as Zuhra, her mother chose the name of Hangama for her when she became a singer. She currently lives in Toronto, Canada where she continues her music career. Before her emigration from Afghanistan in the early 1980s, she was regarded as one of the most popular female singers of the country.  Besides Afghanistan, she is also known in Tajikistan and Iran.

Hangama started her music career in 1975 at only 15 years old. She was raised in a music loving family. She was a music student of Ustad NaiNawaz in Kabul.
In the 1980s she emerged with Ahmad Wali as a very popular musical duo and later became the unrivaled singer-couple in the mid-1980s. The duo recorded their first few songs in Afghanistan with the accompanying videos becoming immensely popular. Their songs remain classics of the Afghan musical archives. 
After leaving Afghanistan for Germany in 1985, Hangama and Ahmad Wali got married. She gave birth to a son named Massieh in 1986.
Hangama won the ATN Award as a Best Female singer on November 29, 2008 and she was also nominated for best female singer on Noor TV awards in April 2008 however she was outcompeted by the Afghan singer Naghma who instead won the award.

Concerts 
After leaving Germany, she has been having lots of concerts alone and with singers like Najim Nawabi, Nasrat Parsa, Leila Forouhar, Naim Popal, Freshta Samah, Haider Salim, Walid Soroor and Waheed Soroor.

In 2005, Hangama returned to Afghanistan for a round of concerts in [Mazar sharif] and Kabul. Reportedly she was applauded for her contribution to the music of Afghanistan over the years. Since then she has been having concerts and TV shows at least once a year in different TV stations in Kabul.

References

External links 
 Hangama's Official Website: http://hangama.info
 Hangama Videos 

1960 births
Living people
Afghan singers
Afghan musicians
People from Kabul
Afghan Tajik people
Persian-language singers
Afghan emigrants to Canada
Afghan expatriates in Canada
20th-century Afghan women singers
21st-century Afghan women singers